Barnard is a version of the surname Bernard, which is a French and West Germanic masculine given name and surname. The surname means as tough as a bear, Bar(Bear)+nard/hard(hardy/tough)


People 
Some of the people bearing the surname Barnard in England are thought to have arrived after the time of the Norman Conquest (1066), Changing their surnames from Bernard to Barnard. Some of whom, it has been suggested, can be traced back to Hugo Bernard. Some of the Barnard family in England may have been Huguenots who fled from the Atlantic coast region of France circa 1685 (the time of the revocation of the edict of Nantes) or earlier than that date.  By contrast, the Barnard family in Holland (the western provinces of the Netherlands) can be definitively traced back to circa 1751 (Izaak Barnard) of Scheveningen.The surname Barnard is also found in  South Africa among the Afrikaner community. An example of this is Christiaan Barnard, A South African Cardiac Surgeon who performed the first Successful Heart Transplant.The surname is Also found in Australia and North America because of mostly UK and Huguenot immigration from Europe. Other families bearing or subsequently adopting the surname Barnard arrived as Jewish immigrants from continental Europe after 1656  and are well documented. Some of the latter branch are descendants of Rabbi Daniel Barnard of Canterbury, with recorded descendants around London, Chatham, Dartford, Kingston upon Hull, Stockton-on-Tees,  Bournemouth, Ipswich, Norwich and in Australia.

Surname 
In England the surname is most commonly found in Greater London and the South Eastern counties (most common occurrences are in Essex, East Sussex, Kent and Suffolk). And in the United States of America it is most commonly found in California, Texas, Florida, and New York. It is also found in France, Belgium, Canada, The Netherlands, South Africa, Australia, and occasionally in Germany.
The first syllable of the name derives from  bear; Bär or Baer in German. corresponding family names are BAER, BER, BERR, BEHR, BERNHARDT, BERNARD (in France).

List of people with the surname
 Alfred Barnard (1837–1918), British brewing and distilling historian
 Aneurin Barnard (born 1987), Welsh actor
 Andrew Barnard (1773–1855), Irish-born British Army General
 Anita Barnard (born 1960), American poet and artist
 Anne Barnard, American journalist
 Lady Anne Barnard (1750–1825), Scottish travel writer, artist and socialite
 Anne Henslow Barnard (1833–1899), British botanical artist
 Baron Barnard, of Barnard Castle in the Bishopric of Durham, a title created in 1698 in the Peerage of England
 Bill Barnard (1886–1958), New Zealand politician
 Bob Barnard (musician) (born 1933), Australian jazz trumpeter
 Catherine Barnard, British legal scholar
 Cecil Barnard, the youth name of Hotep Idris Galeta (born 1941), South African jazz pianist and educator
 Charles Barnard (American football) (1915–2008), American football player
 C. D. Barnard (1895–1971), British racing and record-breaking pilot
 Chester Barnard (1886–1961), telecommunications executive and author
 Chris Barnard (author) (born 1939), South African writer
 Christiaan Barnard (1922–2001), South African surgeon, who performed the world's first heart transplant operation
 Claude Barnard (1890–1957), Australian politician
Clio Barnard, British film director
 Daniel D. Barnard (1797–1861), US Representative from New York
 Darren Barnard (born 1971), British professional footballer, played for Wales, Chelsea, Bristol City, Barnsley, Grimsby and Aldershot
 Dorothy Wedderburn (née Barnard, 1925–2012), British economist and academic
 Doug Barnard Jr. (1922–2018), American lawyer and politician
 Edward Emerson Barnard (1857–1923), American astronomer for whom Barnard's Star is named
 Ernest Barnard, President of Major League Baseball's American League, 1927–1931
 Eusebius Barnard (1802–1865), American abolitionist and station master on the Underground Railroad
 Frances Catherine Barnard (1796–1869), English author
 Francis Jones Barnard, aka Frank Barnard Sr., pioneer freighting entrepreneur and Member of Parliament in Canada from 1879 to 1887
 Francis Stillman Barnard, aka Frank Barnard Jr., Canadian MP and Lieutenant-Governor of British Columbia from 1914 to 1919
 Franklyn Leslie Barnard (1896–1927), British air racing and airline pilot
 Frederick Augustus Porter Barnard (1809–1889), American scientist and educationalist
 George Alfred Barnard (1915–2002), British statistician
 George Grey Barnard (1863–1938), American sculptor
 George N. Barnard (1819–1902), American Civil War photographer
 Henk Barnard (1922–2003), Dutch writer of children's literature, journalist and television director
 Henry Barnard (1811–1900), American educationalist
 Henry D. Barnard, adopted name of Chalmers Bryant, a fictional character in James Hilton's novel Lost Horizon
 Holly Barnard, American Geographer
 Isaac D. Barnard (1791–1831), American lawyer and politician
 John Barnard (born 1946), British race car designer
 John Barnard (musician) (born 1948), British church music composer, conductor and organist
 John G. Barnard (1815–1882), US Army general during the American Civil War and Chief Engineer of the Defenses of Washington (1863–1864)
 Joseph Osmond Barnard (1816–1865), engraver of the Mauritius "Post Office" stamps
 Kate Barnard (1875–1930), American politician
 Keppel Harcourt Barnard (1887–1964), South African zoologist
 Lance Barnard (1919–1997), Australian politician
 Lee Barnard (born 1984), English football player
 Leigh Barnard (born 1958), English football player
 Lester Barnard (1894–1985), American college sports coach
 Margaret Barnard (1898–1992), British painter and linocut maker
 Marius Barnard (surgeon), South African surgeon, brother of Christiaan Barnard and inventor of critical illness insurance
 Marius Barnard (tennis), South African professional tennis player
 Marjorie Barnard (1897–1987), Australian writer, also collaborated with Flora Eldershaw (1897–1956)
 Mary Barnard (1909–2002), American poet and translator
 Mary Baylis Barnard (1870–1946), English artist
 Megan Barnard (born 1984), Australian sports presenter
 Mike Barnard (sportsman, born 1933) (Henry Michael Barnard) (1933–2018), English first class cricketer and professional footballer
 Neal D. Barnard, American medical doctor, author and clinical researcher
 Niel Barnard, head of South Africa's National Intelligence Service during the apartheid era
 Norman R. Barnard (1914–1998), American probate judge
 Paolo Barnard, Italian journalist
 Pat Barnard (born 1981), South African rugby union player
 Paul Barnard (born 1973), American Politician
 Ray Barnard, English footballer
 Rebecca Barnard (born 1960), Australian singer, songwriter and musician
 Robert Barnard (1936–2013), English mystery writer and critic
 Simeon Barnard (1844–1924), racehorse owner and racing official in South Australia
 Timpoochee Barnard (1776–1834), Native American major in the United States army
 Thomas Barnard (c. 1726/28–1806), Anglican bishop in Ireland
 Tom Barnard, American radio talk show host
 Trevor Barnard (born 1938), British-born Australian pianist and teacher
 William Barnard (bishop) (1803–1831), Irish Bishop of Derry, Northern Ireland
 William Barnard (engraver) (1774–1849), English mezzotint engraver
 William O. Barnard (1852–1939), representative in U.S. Congress from Indiana

Given name 
 Bernard Courtois (also spelled Barnard Courtois), (1777–1838), French chemist
 Barnard E. Bee Sr. (1787–1853), early settler and political leader in the Republic of Texas
 Barnard Elliott Bee Jr. (1824–1861), Confederate Army general during the American Civil War
 Barnard Pananasky, a pseudonym of Gary Morgan (actor)
 M. Barnard Eldershaw, Australian literary pseudonym

Schools 
Barnard Castle School
Barnard College
Barnard School South Hampton

Places 
Barnard, Kansas
Barnard, Michigan
Barnard, Missouri
Barnard, South Dakota
Barnard, Vermont
Barnard Castle, England
Barnard River
Barnardsville, North Carolina
East Barnard, Texas
Mount Barnard

See also 
Barnardo (surname list)
Barnes (name)
Barnett (name list) 
Barney (disambiguation)
Barnhart (surname list)
Barrett (clan) 
 Bernard (disambiguation)
Bernardakis (surname list)
 Bernhard (disambiguation)

References 

English-language surnames
Surnames from given names